This discography is an overview of the musical works released by the German schlager and pop musician Nicole, who gained international recognition when she won the 1982 Eurovision Song Contest performing "Ein bißchen Frieden".

Studio albums

Compilation Albums 
 1992: Augenblicke – Meine Schönsten Lieder
 1993: So Many Songs Are In My Heart (English)
 2005: Best Of 1982–2005
 2010: 30 Jahre – Mit Leib und Seele

Singles

Secondary singles chart positions

Additional Singles 

 1982: "Meine kleine Freiheit"
 1983: "So viele Lieder sind in mir"
 1986: "Mit dir leben"
 1988: "Nie mehr ohne dich"
 1988: "So wie du"
 1989: "Johnny (Nur noch einen Tag)"
 1991: "Steh’ wie ein Mann zu mir"
 1991: "Und ich denke schon wieder an dich"
 1993: "Mehr als nur zusammen schlafen geh’n"
 1994: "Ich hab dich geliebt"
 1994: "Am liebsten mit dir"
 1995: "Und außerdem hab’ ich dich lieb"
 1995: "Die zweite Liebe"
 1996: "Voulez-vous danser"
 1996: "Die Großen läßt man laufen"
 1997: "Weil ich dich unendlich liebe"
 1997: "Nicole’s Single Party"
 1997: "Schlaf nicht wieder ein"
 1998: "Wer schläft schon gern allein"
 1998: "Abrakadabra"
 1998: "Halt dich fest"
 1999: "Ohne dich leben"
 2000: "Versinken in dir"
 2000: "Ich hab’ dich noch lieb"
 2001: "Kaleidoskop"
 2001: "No One Makes Love Like You"
 2001: "Everytime You’re with Me"
 2001: "Stark sein"
 2002: "Sommer Sommer"
 2002: "Ich lieb dich so sehr"
 2003: "Vergiss’ mich, wenn du kannst"
 2003: "Frauen sind kleine Schweine"
 2004: "Für die Seele"
 2004: "Ich will Musik"
 2004: "Kein Abschied ist für immer"
 2005: "Alles fließt"
 2005: "Der erste Tag ohne dich"
 2005: "Engel ohne Flügel"
 2006: "Begleite mich"
 2006: "Wenn Träume fliegen lernen"
 2006: "Ich tanz auf Wolken"
 2006: "Ich glaube noch immer an den Weihnachtsmann"
 2007: "Avalon"
 2007: "Grüß mir die Sonne"
 2007: "Ich lieb dich ohne Ende"
 2007: "Hand in Hand"
 2008: "Mitten ins Herz"
 2008: "Du bist der Sommer"
 2008: "Nass bis auf die Haut"
 2008: "Ich schwöre"
 2009: "Meine Nummer 1"
 2009: "Tanz diesen Walzer mit mir"
 2010: "Wer weiß den schon, was Morgen ist"
 2010: "Mit Leib und Seele"
 2011: "Ich bleib’ bei dir"
 2011: "Mach die Augen zu"
 2011: "Liebe im Überfluss"
 2012: "Jetzt komm ich"
 2012: "Die Frau im Spiegel"
 2012: "Jeder Tag mit dir"
 2013: "Alles nur für Dich"
 2013: "Leider gut"
 2013: "Leg deinen Kopf in meinen Schoß"
 2014: "Ein neuer Tag"
 2014: "Afrika"
 2014: "Das ist mein Weg"
 2015: "Hello Mrs. Sippi"
 2015: "Frag mich nicht"
 2016: "Wir seh’n uns im Himmel"
 2016: "Zerrissenes Herz"
 2016: "Traumfänger"
 2017: "Geh diesen Weg mit mir"
 2017: "Euphoria" (cover version of: "Loreen – Euphoria)
 2018: "Mosaik"
 2019: "50 ist das neue 25"

B-sides 
This is a list of B-sides that did not attain a chart position and were not included on any albums.

 1981: "One Butterfly"

See also 
 Nicole discography on German Wikipedia

References

External links
 
 

Nicole
Schlager music discographies
Pop music discographies
Schlager songs
German-language songs